Paraburkholderia rhizosphaerae is a bacterium from the genus of Paraburkholderia which has been isolated from rhizosphere soil in Daejeon in Korea.

References

rhizosphaerae
Bacteria described in 2015